Nicholas Gaston André (7 October 1934 – 26 December 1990) was a South African boxer. He competed in the men's welterweight event at the 1956 Summer Olympics.

References

External links
 

1934 births
1990 deaths
Welterweight boxers
South African male boxers
Olympic boxers of South Africa
Boxers at the 1956 Summer Olympics
Sportspeople from Durban